Vanderhorstia is a genus of gobies native to the Indian and Pacific oceans. The name of this genus honours the Dutch biologist Cornelius van der Horst (1889-1951) of the University of the Witwatersrand, Johannesburg, who was well known for his interest in marine biology.

Species
There are currently 29 recognized species in this genus: 
 Vanderhorstia ambanoro Fourmanoir, 1957 (Ambanoro prawn-goby)
 Vanderhorstia atriclypea Garman, 1903 
 Vanderhorstia attenuata J. E. Randall, 2007 (Tapertail shrimpgoby)
 Vanderhorstia auronotata J. E. Randall, 2007 (Gold-marked shrimpgoby)
 Vanderhorstia auropunctata Tomiyama, 1955
 Vanderhorstia bella D. W. Greenfield & Longenecker, 2005
 Vanderhorstia belloides J. E. Randall, 2007 (Bella shrimpgoby)
 Vanderhorstia cyanolineata T. Suzuki & I. S. Chen, 2014 
 Vanderhorstia delagoae Barnard, 1937 (Candystick Goby)
 Vanderhorstia dorsomacula J. E. Randall, 2007 (Dorsalspot shrimpgoby)
 Vanderhorstia flavilineata G. R. Allen & Munday, 1995 (Yellow-lined shrimpgoby)
 Vanderhorstia fulvopelvis T. Suzuki & I. S. Chen, 2014 
 Vanderhorstia hiramatsui Iwata, Shibukawa & Ohnishi, 2007
 Vanderhorstia kizakura Iwata, Shibukawa & Ohnishi, 2007
 Vanderhorstia lepidobucca G. R. Allen, Peristiwady & Erdmann, 2014 (Scalycheek shrimpgoby) 
 Vanderhorstia longimanus M. C. W. Weber, 1909
 Vanderhorstia macropteryx V. Franz, 1910 (Bigfin shrimpgoby)
 Vanderhorstia mertensi Klausewitz, 1974 (Mertens' prawn-goby)
 Vanderhorstia nannai R. Winterbottom, Iwata & Kozawa, 2005 (Moon-spotted shrimp goby)
 Vanderhorstia nobilis G. R. Allen & J. E. Randall, 2006 (Majestic shrimpgoby)
 Vanderhorstia opercularis J. E. Randall, 2007
 Vanderhorstia ornatissima J. L. B. Smith, 1959 (Ornate prawn-goby)
 Vanderhorstia papilio Shibukawa & T. Suzuki, 2004 (Butterfly shrimpgoby)
 Vanderhorstia phaeosticta J. E. Randall, K. T. Shao & J. P. Chen, 2007 (Yellowfoot shrimpgoby)
 Vanderhorstia puncticeps S. M. Deng & G. Q. Xiong, 1980
 Vanderhorstia rapa Iwata, Shibukawa & Ohnishi, 2007
 Vanderhorstia steelei J. E. Randall & Munday, 2008 
Vanderhorstia vandersteene 
 Vanderhorstia wayag G. R. Allen & Erdmann, 2012 (Wayag shrimpgoby)

References

 
Taxa named by J. L. B. Smith
Gobiinae